World PT Day is observed to generate awareness about the crucial contribution physiotherapists make to society, enabling people to be mobile, well, and independent. This is observed on 8 September. Designated in 1996, World PT Day is promoted by World Physiotherapy.

References

Recurring events established in 1996
Health awareness days
September observances
Unofficial observances

External links